Carex idaea is a species of sedge in the family Cyperaceae, native to Crete. It is genetically very close to Carex distans, but has a number of distinct differences, including a higher number of chromosomes (2n=74), stiffer leaves, and dark red-purple flowers.

References

idaea
Endemic flora of Greece
Flora of Crete
Plants described in 1985